RLM may refer to:

 RLM, a wholly owned subsidiary of the Lockheed Martin Corporation, with significant presence in the Australian defence industry
 Real Life Ministries, a non-denominational Evangelical Christian church in Idaho
 , the Ministry of Aviation (Germany) (1933–45)
 Rheinisches Landesmuseum (Rhineland State Museum)
 Right-to-left mark, a Unicode bidirectional formatting character
 Red Letter Media, an American video and film production company that has achieved fame for its "Plinkett Reviews"
 Reprise License Manager, a software toolkit providing license management
 In statistics, a robust linear model
 In computer software, release management

See also
 RLML (disambiguation)